Natalia Arroyo is a former soccer player, journalist and is currently the head coach of the Catalonia Women's Football Team and Real Sociedad Femenino. Previously, she played professionally for FC Barcelona and also for Espanyol, retiring in 2009.

References 

Year of birth missing (living people)
Living people
Spanish journalists
Spanish women's footballers

Women's association footballers not categorized by position
Spanish football managers
RCD Espanyol Femenino players
FC Barcelona Femení players
People from Esplugues de Llobregat
Sportspeople from the Province of Barcelona
Footballers from Catalonia
Primera División (women) managers